Johanan (Hebrew  Yôḥānān), son of Joiada, was the fifth high priest after the rebuilding of the temple in Jerusalem by the Jews who had returned from the Babylonian captivity. His reign is estimated to have been from c. 410–371 BCE; he was succeeded by his son Jaddua. The Bible gives no details about his life. Johanan lived during the reigns of king Darius II of Persia (423 BC – 405 or 404 BC) and his son Artaxerxes II (404 BC – 358 BC), whose Achaemenid Empire included Judah as a province.

Murder in the Temple
Flavius Josephus records that Johanan's brother Jesus was promised the high priesthood by Bagoas, general of Artaxerxes. Jesus got in a quarrel with Johanan in the temple and Johanan killed him. Bagoas knew that Johanan had slain Jesus in the temple saying to him "Have you had the impudence to perpetrate murder in the temple." Bagoas was forbidden to enter the temple, but he entered anyway saying "Am not I purer than he that was slain in the temple?" Bagoas had not seen such a savage crime and responded by commanding the Persians to punish the Jews for seven years. His son Jaddua eventually took over the position when Johanan died, as briefly mentioned by Josephus, but was not accepted in the book of chronicles according to Nehemiah 12:23.

Archaeology

Letter from Elephantine papyri
Among the Elephantine papyri, a collection of 5th century BCE Hebrew manuscripts from the Jewish community at Elephantine in Egypt, a letter was found in which Johanan is mentioned. The letter is dated "the 20th of Marshewan, year 17 of king Darius", which corresponds to 407 BCE.  It is addressed to Bagoas, the governor of Judah, and is a request for the rebuilding of a Jewish temple at Elephantine, which was destroyed by Egyptian pagans. The letter includes the following passage:
 "(...) We have also sent a letter before now, when this evil was done to us, to our lord and to the high priest Johanan and his colleagues the priests in Jerusalem and to Ostanes the brother of Anani and the nobles of the Jews, Never a letter have they sent to us. (...)" 
It has been suggested that the Anani that is referred to here might be the same as in 1 Chronicles 3:24.

Yohanan coin
On a silver coin from the late Persian period, Dan Barag and other scholars have identified the Hebrew phrase  ("Yoḥanan the priest"). Because it is generally dated between 350 BCE and Alexander the Great's conquest of Persia, around 333 BCE, the coin is usually attributed to a second high priest called Johanan, who is not mentioned in the Bible. Thus, the coin seems to lend support to the hypothesis by Frank Moore Cross from 1975 that there were two subsequent father/son pairs of high priests called Johanan and Jaddua, the latter pair of which was accidentally omitted from the biblical text because of haplography. However, Lisbeth Fried has challenged this late dating of the coin and has suggested a date between 378 and 368 BCE. She believes that the coin refers to the same individual as the one mentioned in Josephus and Nehemiah, and that it is unnecessary to propose a second Johanan.

Name
There is dispute over his actual name.  Neh 12:11 lists him as Jonathan, while 12:22 mentions Joiada's successor as Johanan.  Josephus also lists him as Johanan (John).

According to the Anchor Bible Dictionary there is also a dispute regarding the genealogy of Johanan. Neh 12:10–11 lists Johanan as the grandson of Eliashib while Neh 12:23 identifies him as the son of Eliashib. "Although it is possible that Heb ben is to be translated as 'grandson' in Neh 12:23; cf. NEB, JB)"

There is yet to be extrabiblical proof that a man named Jonathan ever served as high priest. This has led many to believe that the biblical text has a copy mistake.

Patrilineal Ancestry

See also
List of biblical figures identified in extra-biblical sources

References

5th-century BCE High Priests of Israel
4th-century BCE High Priests of Israel
Year of death unknown
Year of birth unknown